The Heineken Prizes for Arts and Sciences consist of 11 awards biannually bestowed by Royal Netherlands Academy of Arts and Sciences. The prizes are named in honor of Henry Pierre Heineken, son of founder Gerard Adriaan Heineken, Alfred Heineken, former chairman of Heineken Holdings, and Charlene de Carvalho-Heineken, current chair of the Heineken Prizes Foundations, which fund all Heineken Prizes for Arts and Sciences. Thirteen winners of the Dr H. P. Heineken Prize for Biochemistry and Biophysics or the Dr A. H. Heineken Prize for Medicine subsequently were awarded a Nobel Prize.

Organization
The five science prizes ($200,000 each) are: 
1.  Dr H. P. Heineken Prize for Biochemistry and Biophysics 
2–4. Dr A. H. Heineken Prizes for History, Medicine and Environmental Sciences 
5. C. L. de Carvalho-Heineken Prize for Cognitive Sciences 

In 1988, the Dr A. H. Heineken Prize for Art was established to be awarded to an outstanding artist working in the Netherlands. The prize is €100,000, half of which is to be spent on a publication and/or exhibit.

Since 2010, Heineken Young Scientists Awards are given to young talent in similar research fields as the Dr H. P. Heineken, Dr A. H. Heineken and C. L. de Carvalho-Heineken Prizes.

Selection
The selection system of the Heineken Prizes can be compared to that of the Nobel Prizes. Scientists from all over the world are invited to nominate fellow scientists for the Heineken Prizes. The Royal Netherlands Academy appoints special committees consisting of eminent scientists and chaired by a member of the board of one of the academy's two divisions. Both members and nonmembers of the academy are eligible for membership of these committees. An independent jury of members of the academy, acting in a personal capacity, chooses the winners of the Dr A. H. Heineken Prize for Art.

The Heineken Prizes are awarded in a special session of the Royal Netherlands Academy of Arts and Sciences, which takes place every even year at the Beurs van Berlage in Amsterdam. In 2002, 2004, 2006, 2008, 2010 and 2012 the Prizes were presented by the Prince of Orange.

List of laureates

Dr H. P. Heineken Prize for Biochemistry and Biophysics
2022 Carolyn Bertozzi
2020 Bruce Stillman
2018 Xiaowei Zhuang
2016 Jennifer Doudna
2014  Christopher Dobson
2012  Titia de Lange 
2010  Franz-Ulrich Hartl
2008  Jack W. Szostak
2006  Alec J. Jeffreys 
2004  Andrew Z. Fire
2002  Roger Y. Tsien
2000  James Rothman
1998  Anthony J. Pawson
1996  Paul M. Nurse
1994  Michael J. Berridge
1992  Piet Borst
1990  Philip Leder
1988  Thomas R. Cech
1985  Bela Julesz and Werner E. Reichardt
1982  Charles Weissmann
1979  Aaron Klug
1976  Laurens L. M. van Deenen
1973  Christian de Duve
1970  Britton Chance
1967  Jean L. A. Brachet
1964  Erwin Chargaff

Dr A. H. Heineken Prize for Medicine
2022  Vishva M. Dixit
2020  Karl Deisseroth
2018  Peter Carmeliet
2016  Stephen Jackson
2014  Kari Alitalo
2012  Hans Clevers
2010  Ralph Steinman
2008  Sir Richard Peto
2006  Mary-Claire King 
2004  Elizabeth H. Blackburn
2002  Dennis Selkoe
2000  Eric R. Kandel
1998  Barry J. Marshall
1996  David de Wied
1994  Luc Montagnier
1992  Salvador Moncada
1990  Johannes J. van Rood
1989  Paul C. Lauterbur

Dr A. H. Heineken Prize for Environmental Sciences
2022 Carl Folke
2020 Corinne Le Quéré
2018 Paul D. N. Hebert
2016 Georgina Mace
2014  Jaap Sinninghe Damsté
2012  William Laurance
2010  David Tilman
2008  Bert Brunekreef
2006  Stuart L. Pimm
2004  Simon A. Levin
2002  Lonnie G. Thompson
2000  Poul Harremoës
1998  Paul R. Ehrlich
1996  Herman Daly
1994  BirdLife International (Colin J. Bibby)
1992  Marko Branica
1990  James E. Lovelock

Dr A. H. Heineken Prize for History
2022 Sunil Amrith
2020 Lorraine Daston
2018 J. R. McNeill
2016 Judith Herrin
2014 Aleida Assmann
2012 Geoffrey Parker
2010 Rosamond McKitterick
2008 Jonathan Israel	
2006 Joel Mokyr 
2004 Jacques Le Goff
2002 Heinz Schilling
2000 Jan de Vries
1998 Mona Ozouf
1996 Heiko A. Oberman
1994 Peter R.L. Brown
1992 Herman Van der Wee
1990 Peter Gay

C.L. de Carvalho-Heineken Prize for Cognitive Sciences (before 2014: Dr A. H. Heineken Prize for Cognitive Sciences)
2022 Kia Nobre
2020 Robert Zatorre
2018 Nancy Kanwisher
2016  Elizabeth Spelke
2014  James McClelland
2012  John Duncan
2010  Michael Tomasello
2008  Stanislas Dehaene
2006  John R. Anderson

Dr A. H. Heineken Prize for Art
2022  Remy Jungerman
2020  Ansuya Blom
2018  Erik van Lieshout
2016  Yvonne Dröge Wendel
2014  Wendelien van Oldenborgh
2012  Peter Struycken 
2010  Mark Manders
2008  Barbara Visser
2006  Job Koelewijn
2004  Daan van Golden
2002  Aernout Mik
2000  Guido Geelen
1998  Jan van de Pavert
1996  Karel Martens
1994  Matthijs Röling
1992  Carel Visser
1990  Marrie Bot
1988  Toon Verhoef

Nobel Prizes
The following winners of the Heineken Prizes for Medicine and Biochemistry and Biophysics have since won a Nobel Prize:

 Christian de Duve
 Dr. H. P. Heineken Prize for Biochemistry and Biophysics 1973
 Nobel Prize in Physiology or Medicine 1974
 Aaron Klug
 Dr. H. P. Heineken Prize for Biochemistry and Biophysics 1979
 Nobel Prize in Chemistry 1982
 Thomas Cech
 Dr. H. P. Heineken Prize for Biochemistry and Biophysics 1988
 Nobel Prize in Chemistry 1989
 Paul C. Lauterbur
 Dr. A. H. Heineken Prize for Medicine 1989
 Nobel Prize in Physiology or Medicine 2003
 Paul Nurse
 Dr. H. P. Heineken Prize for Biochemistry and Biophysics 1996
 Nobel Prize in Physiology or Medicine 2001
 Barry J. Marshall
 Dr. A. H. Heineken Prize for Medicine 1998
 Nobel Prize in Physiology or Medicine 2005
 Eric R. Kandel
 Dr. A. H. Heineken Prize for Medicine in 2000
 Nobel Prize in Physiology or Medicine 2000
 Andrew Z. Fire
 Dr. H. P. Heineken Prize for Biochemistry and Biophysics 2004
 Nobel Prize in Physiology or Medicine 2006
 Roger Y. Tsien
 Dr. H. P. Heineken Prize for Biochemistry and Biophysics 2002
 Nobel Prize in Chemistry 2008
 Jack W. Szostak 
 Dr. H. P. Heineken Prize for Biochemistry and Biophysics 2008
 Nobel Prize in Physiology or Medicine 2009
Elizabeth Blackburn
 Dr. A. H. Heineken Prize for Medicine 2004
 Nobel Prize in Physiology or Medicine 2009
Ralph M. Steinman
 Dr. A. H. Heineken Prize for Medicine 2010
 Nobel Prize in Physiology or Medicine 2011
 Carolyn Bertozzi
 Dr H. P. Heineken Prize for Biochemistry and Biophysics 2022
 Nobel Prize in Chemistry 2022

See also

 List of European art awards

References 

Dutch art awards
Dutch honorary society awards
Awards of the Royal Netherlands Academy of Arts and Sciences